The 2012–13 Serie A1 is the 94th season of the Serie A1, Italy's premier Water polo league.

 

Seasons in Italian water polo competitions
Italy
Serie A1
Serie A1
2012 in water polo
2013 in water polo